The 2003–04 season was the 95th year of football played by Dundee United, and covers the period from 1 July 2003 to 30 June 2004. United finished the season in fifth place.

United were knocked out of the Tennent's Scottish Cup by Dunfermline in the third round and were beaten by Livingston in the CIS Insurance Cup third round.

Season review
A host of new signings arrived at the club with Ian McCall securing deals from the lower divisions. Mark Kerr, Owen Coyle and Collin Samuel arrived from Falkirk, McCall's former club. Barry Robson also arrived from Inverness Caledonian Thistle and Scotland international Derek McInnes was purchased from recently relegated Premiership club West Brom.

Early season
United got off to a poor start in the league. The first match against Hibs at home ended in a disappointing defeat. The following week, United were thrashed 5–0 away against Celtic. The team didn't end up winning a game till mid-September when United defeated Partick Thistle 2–0 with Charlie Miller scoring a brace.

The team began their Scottish League Cup campaign with a 3–1 home victory over Morton but yet the team's league form was patchy. The first Dundee derby of the season ended in a poor 1–1 draw and then United lost to eventual winners Livingston at the end of October to end the team's league cup campaign. By the end of November, United had picked up just 12 points and were already out of the Cup.

Winter/New Year
December was a lot brighter for United with victories over Kilmarnock 2–0 away and a 2–0 home win over Livingston along with a bright performance away at Ibrox in an unlucky 2–1 defeat to Rangers.

However, in the New Year, United crashed out of the Scottish Cup third round away to Dunfermline who would go on to be finalists that season. The team then enjoyed a 3–2 win over Aberdeen and this would start a memorable unbeaten home record that would stretch out until April.

Match results
Dundee United played a total of 41 competitive matches during the 2003–04 season. The team finished fifth in the Scottish Premier League.

In the cup competitions, United were knocked out of the Tennent's Scottish Cup in the third round for the second successive season, losing to Dunfermline. Livingston knocked United out of the CIS Cup in the third round.

Legend

All results are written with Dundee United's score first.

Bank of Scotland Premierleague

Tennent's Scottish Cup

CIS Insurance Cup

Player details
During the 2003–04 season, United used 24 different players, with a further three players named as a substitute who did not make an appearance on the pitch. The table below shows the number of appearances and goals scored by each player.

|}

Goalscorers
Thirteen players scored for the United first team with the team scoring 51 goals in total. Jim McIntyre was the top goalscorer with eleven goals.

Discipline
During the 2003–04 season, three United players were sent off, and 18 players received at least one yellow card. In total, the team received three dismissals and 69 cautions.

Transfers

In
Seven players were signed during the 2003–04 season, with a total (public) transfer cost of around £200,000. Another player was signed before the start of next season.

The players that joined Dundee United during the 2003–04 season, along with their previous club, are listed below.

Out
Five players left the club during the season with no transfer involving a fee. Two players were loaned out during the season with three players also released before next season.

Listed below are the players that were released during the season, along with the club that they joined. Players did not necessarily join their next club immediately.

Loans out

Playing kit

The jerseys were sponsored by Morning, Noon and Night for the first time.

Awards
 Ian McCall
 Scottish Premier League Manager of the Month: 1
 March 2004

See also
 2003–04 Scottish Premier League
 2003–04 Scottish Cup
 2003–04 in Scottish football

References

External links
 Official site: 2003/04 Results
 Soccerbase
 Results 
 Squad stats
 Transfers

2003-04
Scottish football clubs 2003–04 season